Otto Beständig (21 February 1835, Striegau – 26 February 1917, Hamburg) was a German composer, conductor, organist, and pianist.

Compositions 

Sacred Oratorios

Salomons Tempelweihe

Der Tod Baldurs

Sonatas

Sonata for Piano, Harmonium, Violin, and Cello (op. 27) 1873

Orchestral Music

Symphony

Citations

Bibliography

External links 
 
 

1835 births
1917 deaths
German pianists
German composers